Hoërskool Rob Ferreira (Rob Ferreira High School) is a Public Afrikaans and English medium co-educational High School located in White River, Mpumalanga a province of South Africa. Learners are called Robbies.

History 
The school is named after the late Mr. Rob Ferreira, then L.U.R. In the old Transvaal Province government. Uncle Rob, as he was well-known, was a community man who strived to establish facilities for the community. Through his vision and mediation, Rob Ferreira High School was established. At that time, the grounds on which the school building, the sports ground and the hostel were situated was part of a farm belonging to Oom Rob. He then cut 28 hectares from the farm and donated to the then Department of Education for the establishment of the new school

Rob Ferreira High School grew like a loot from the old Witrivier Primary School, which changed status to a Junior High School in 1948. Thus, the school developed into an independent high school in 1954 with Mr. P. H. Cat acting as headmaster. The school building was completed in 1954 and the residence in 1959.

Symbolism of Crest 
The school colors as compiled in 1954 are green, orange and white.

Green: In the rehearsal symbolizes youth and hope. Orange: Symbolizes power and endurance. White: Symbolizes faith and purity.

The Tree

The High School has grown from the Primary School.  The tree is anchored in our own soil. The Wild Fig on the crest is characteristic of the Lowveld.

The Circle

The orange background is symbolic of endurance as well as a reminder of the orange farms surrounding our town and school.

Furthermore, it refers to the never-ending cycle of a school. Year after year and generation after generation the task of a school is to prepare young people to make a significant contribution to society.

The Hill

Legogote - the pride of the White River escarpment has a significant place in our crest.

The Sky

This white element of the crest reminds that faith should always be placed above anything else.

The White Lines

These lines have been placed under Legogote and pays homage to the White River after which our town was named.

Mascot
Since the time of Langenhoven, the elephant became the symbol of the wonder of Afrikaans. In the square of the school is a small elephant replica mounted for decades. This elephant is an inseparable part of Rob tradition. He regularly changes color because he is painted over by the Robbies. Six of Rob's previous heads tried their best to stop this painting. Of course without success. A few years ago, Mr van Rensburg saw that this was not a fight he would ever win. It's a piece of tradition at Rob that could not be eradicated. He allowed the elephant to be painted.

When Valentine's Day arrives, he is painted pinks with hearts. When the Blue Bulls play rugby against the Lions, he is blue on one day and red and white the next day. And so it goes on and on. But one thing is certain: his blood is definitely orange! The little elephant even became the inspiration for the school's mascot.

References

High schools in Mpumalanga